Vijayan is a South Indian name and may refer to:

Given name
Pinarayi Vijayan (born 1944), Indian politician
Vijayan (actor) (1944–2007), Tamil & Malayalam film actor
Vijayan (stunt coordinator), action choreographer for South Indian films
Vijayan Nair, American statistician
Vijayan Pillai, Indian politician
Vijayan K. Pillai (born c. 1948), American professor of social work

Surname
Amritha Meera Vijayan (born 1990), South Indian actress
Chandroth Vijayan (born 1936), Indian cricketer
E. K. Vijayan (born 1953), Indian politician
East Coast Vijayan, Indian lyricist
G. S. Vijayan, Indian film director
Geetha Vijayan (born 1972), Indian actress
I. M. Vijayan (born 1969), Indian footballer
Jay Vijayan, Tamil entrepreneur, engineer, inventor and investor
K. Vijayan, Indian film director
M. Vijayan (born 1941), Indian structural biologist
M. N. Vijayan (1930–2007), Indian writer, orator and academic
O. V. Vijayan (1930–2005), Malayalam novelist and cartoonist
P. Vijayan (born 1968), Indian police officer
Rajisha Vijayan, Indian film actress in Malayalam films
Raman Vijayan (born 1973), Indian football manager
Rex Vijayan (born 1983), Indian guitarist, composer and producer
Sivakumar Vijayan (born 1982), Indian cinematographer
T. C. Vijayan, Indian politician
V S Vijayan (born 1945), Indian environmentalist and wildlife biologist
V. T. Vijayan, South Indian film editor
Vazhenkada Vijayan, Indian Kathakali dancer
Vinod Vijayan, Indian film producer and director

See also
Dasan and Vijayan, fictional characters in the Nadodikkattu film series